Coleraine Academical Institution (CAI and styled locally as Coleraine Inst) was a voluntary grammar school for boys in Coleraine, County Londonderry, Northern Ireland.

Coleraine Academical Institution occupied a  site on the Castlerock Road, where it was founded in 1860. It was, for many years, a boarding school until the boarding department closed in 1999. It was one of eight Northern Irish schools represented on the Headmasters' and Headmistresses' Conference (HMC). The school had an enrolment of 778 pupils, aged 11–19, as of 2012. The school was generally regarded for its high academic standards and extensive sporting facilities, including  playing fields, indoor swimming pool, boathouse, rugby pavilion, sports pavilion and gymnasium. The school has an extensive past pupil organisation, "The Coleraine Old Boys' Association", which has several branches across the world.

Coleraine Inst was nine times winner of the Ulster Schools Cup, the world's second-oldest rugby competition, in which it competed every year since 1876.

The school origins and land are tied to the Worshipful Company of Clothworkers, one of the Livery Companies making up the City of London Corporation.  

As part of a general re-organisation of schools in the Coleraine area over a number of years, Coleraine Academical Institution was merged in September 2015 with Coleraine High School on Coleraine's Lodge Road and became a fully boys' and girls' grammar school called Coleraine Grammar School.

Headmasters
Over the years the school has had nine headmasters.

 (1860–1870) Alex Waugh Young, CAI's founding principal. Very little is known of him.
 (1870–1915) Thomas Galway Houston served the school for 45 years, enjoying a long retirement in Portstewart until his death in 1939 at the age of 96. Houston served as a member of the Senate in the Stormont Parliament for Queen's University, Belfast.
 (1915–1927) Thomas James Beare – affectionately known as "Tommy John" – had a rather shorter tenure in office, until his premature retirement on health grounds in 1927.
 (1927–1955) William White – commonly known as "The Chief"
 (1955–1979) George Humphreys, by whom the major physical expansion of the school was guided. Previously on the staff at Campbell College, Belfast, it was during his headmastership that Inst became an H.M.C. school.
 (1979–1984) Robert F. J. Rodgers, former headmaster of Bangor Grammar School, was headmaster of Inst until his appointment as principal of Stranmillis Training College, Belfast.
 (1984–2003) R. Stanley Forsythe was appointed following a ten-year period as headmaster of The Royal School, Dungannon and remained in post until retirement.
 (2004–2007) Leonard F. Quigg was the first headmaster in the school's history to have been promoted 'from within the ranks'. Quigg served as an assistant master, head of English, Senior Master, as both junior and senior Vice-Principal before his appointment as headmaster in January 2004. Quigg retired in 2007.
 (2007–2015) David Carruthers is CAI's current headmaster. He was previously the head of mathematics at Royal Belfast Academical Institution.

Notable alumni

 John Bodkin Adams, suspected serial killer
Richard Archibald, Irish Olympic rower 2004 and 2008. World silver medallist 2005, bronze medallist 2006
 Sir Dawson Bates, 1st Baronet, politician
 Air Marshal Sir George Beamish
Victor Beamish RAF ace fighter pilot in WWII
 David Burnside, Ulster Unionist Party MLA and former MP
 Alan Campbell, 2004, 2008 and 2012 (bronze) Olympic rower, 2006 world champion, 2007 Henley diamond scull winner
 Mark Carruthers, TV presenter/personality
Peter Chambers, 2011 world champion and 2012 Olympic Silver rower
 Richard Chambers, 2007 World Champion and 2008 and 2012 (silver) Olympic rower
 Major General Ed Davis, Commandant General Royal Marines, Governor of Gibraltar
 John Clarke Davison, Ulster Unionist Party (UUP) politician
 Barry Hunter, former Northern Ireland international footballer
 Chris Hunter, British chemist and academic
 David McClarty, UUP MLA for Londonderry East
 Brigadier Mervyn McCord, former Commanding Officer of the Ulster Defence Regiment
 Graeme McDowell, Ryder Cup golfer and U.S. Open winner
 James Nesbitt, film and TV actor
 Jim Shannon, Democratic Unionist Party MP for Strangford
 Tommy Sheppard, Scottish National party MP for Edinburgh East.
 Edward H. Simpson, statistician and civil servant, known for Simpson's paradox
 James Stewart, lawyer
 Andrew Trimble, rugby union player

References

External links
 Old Boys' Association

1860 establishments in Ireland
2015 disestablishments in Northern Ireland
Educational institutions established in 1860
Educational institutions disestablished in 2015
Grammar schools in County Londonderry
Member schools of the Headmasters' and Headmistresses' Conference
Coleraine
Boys' schools in Northern Ireland
Grade B1 listed buildings